Ricardo Manuel Ferreira Sousa (born 21 December 1981), known as Cadú, is a Portuguese former professional footballer who played as a central defender currently assistant manager of Primeira Liga club Paços de Ferreira.

He amassed Primeira Liga totals of 121 games and seven goals over five seasons, with Paços de Ferreira, Boavista (two apiece) and Gil Vicente. He spent the vast majority of his career in Romania with CFR Cluj, appearing in 255 competitive matches and winning eight major trophies.

Club career

Portugal
Born in Paços de Ferreira, Cadú began playing professionally with Gondomar S.C. in the Portuguese third division, his solid performances earning him a transfer straight to the Primeira Liga as he signed with another side in the north, F.C. Paços de Ferreira, in summer 2002. In his second season he started in 27 of the 28 matches he appeared in, but his team was relegated after ranking second-bottom.

After Paços' relegation, Cadú joined Boavista FC, also being first choice – 30 games, two goals– in his first year, with the Porto-based club finishing in sixth position.

CFR Cluj
Cadú signed with CFR Cluj from Romania on 12 July 2006, agreeing to a three-year contract for €750.000. He scored once in 25 matches in his debut season, for a final third place in Liga I.

Cadú became CFR's captain in late 2007, whilst helping the team to three consecutive Romanian Cup titles. Additionally, at the end of the 2009–10 campaign, as they won their second league title in three years, he was voted Central Defender of the Year alongside FC Unirea Urziceni's George Galamaz.

On 19 October 2010, Cadú scored twice in the UEFA Champions League group stage match against FC Bayern Munich, once in his own net, in an eventual 3–2 away loss. In late January 2012, he was awarded Romanian citizenship.

Honours
CFR Cluj
Liga I: 2007–08, 2009–10, 2011–12
Cupa României: 2007–08, 2008–09, 2009–10
Supercupa României: 2009, 2010

References

External links

1981 births
Living people
People from Paços de Ferreira
Sportspeople from Porto District
Portuguese footballers
Association football defenders
Primeira Liga players
Liga Portugal 2 players
Segunda Divisão players
Gondomar S.C. players
F.C. Paços de Ferreira players
Boavista F.C. players
Gil Vicente F.C. players
Leixões S.C. players
Merelinense F.C. players
F.C. Maia players
Liga I players
CFR Cluj players
Cypriot First Division players
AEL Limassol players
Portugal under-21 international footballers
Portugal B international footballers
Portuguese expatriate footballers
Expatriate footballers in Romania
Expatriate footballers in Cyprus
Portuguese expatriate sportspeople in Romania
Portuguese expatriate sportspeople in Cyprus